Suryanarayana was the state convener of the Karnataka branch of the Bajrang Dal, an Indian Hindu nationalist youth organisation. He is the successor to Mahendra Kumar, Bajrang dal was blamed for involvement in the 2008 attacks on Christians in southern Karnataka in September 2008 post which Suryanarayana gone undergone.

References

Living people
Activists from Karnataka
Bajrang Dal members
Mangaloreans
Politicians from Mangalore
Indian Hindus
Year of birth missing (living people)